White spruce is a common name for several species of spruce (Picea) and may refer to:

 Picea glauca, native to most of Canada and Alaska with limited populations in the northeastern United States
 Picea engelmannii, native to the Rocky Mountains and Cascade Mountains of the United States and Canada
 Picea pungens, native to the central and southern Rocky Mountains of the United States